Dial-Gate VoIP Softswitch is a SIP-based IP-PBX software for businesses, first released in 2006 by Canadian VoIP PBX solution provider Dialexia. The software serves as a web-based softswitch and billing server for VoIP and PSTN networks. On June 3, 2014, the Dialexia development team announced in a client newsletter that support for Dial-Gate Softswitch versions 3.9 and earlier would cease effective September 1, 2014. The company advised customers to migrate to a currently-supported operating system in order to receive future security updates & technical support.

Software overview 
The Dial-Gate billing platform provides users with advanced real-time monitoring, pre-/post-paid billing, rate/route table management, and CDR report generation. It is integrated with Microsoft Exchange Server to provide voicemail unification, instant messaging and VideoOverIP. On November 19, 2014, Dialexia issued a press release announcing the integration of WebRTC capabilities to Dial Gate Softswitch PBX.

References

External links
 

2006 software
VoIP software